Elisabeth André is a German Computer Scientist from Saarlouis, Saarland who specializes in Intelligent User Interfaces, Virtual Agents, and Social Computing.

Education 
 1988—Computer Science diploma at the University of Saarland
 1995—Computer Science PhD at the University of Saarland
André's research interests include Affective Computing, Embodied Conversational Agents, Multimodal Human-Machine Interaction, and Social Signal Processing.

Career 
 1988–2001—Research associate at the German Research Center for Artificial Intelligence
 1995—Senior researcher
 1999—Principal researcher at the German Research Center for Artificial Intelligence in Saarbrücken, Germany
 2001–present—Computer Science professor and the Founding Chair of Human-Centered Multimedia at the University of Augsburg.
 2004–2006—Managing Director at the Institute of Computer Science at the University of Augsburg
 2007—Representative of the German Research Foundation on Artificial Intelligence, Image, and Speech Processing
 2008–present—German Research Foundation review board member
André was also the General and Program Co-Chair for multiple ACM SIGCHI conferences.

Achievements 
 1995—European Information Technology Information Award
 1998—RoboCup Scientific Award
 2000—Best Paper Award for the International Conference of Intelligent User
 2005—Convivio Best Demo Award for People-Centered Agent Technologies
 2007—Alcatel-Lucent Fellowship at the International Center for Arts and Culture
 2007, 2008, 2009—Best Paper Finalist at the International Conference on Intelligent Virtual Agents
 2010—Elected to Academia Europaea
 2017—Elected to CHI Academy

References 

living people
1961 births
German computer scientists
German women computer scientists
Saarland University alumni
Members of Academia Europaea